The ministry of Jesus, in the canonical gospels, begins with his baptism in the countryside of Roman Judea and Transjordan, near the River Jordan by John the Baptist, and ends in Jerusalem, following the Last Supper with his disciples. The Gospel of Luke states that Jesus was "about 30 years of age" at the start of his ministry. A chronology of Jesus typically sets the date of the start of his ministry at around AD 27–29 and the end in the range AD 30–36.

Jesus' early Galilean ministry begins when after his baptism, he goes back to Galilee from his temptation in the Judaean Desert. In this early period, he preaches around Galilee and recruits his first disciples who begin to travel with him and eventually form the core of the early Church as it is believed that the Apostles dispersed from Jerusalem to found the apostolic sees. The major Galilean ministry which begins in Matthew 8 includes the commissioning of the Twelve Apostles, and covers most of the ministry of Jesus in Galilee. The final Galilean ministry begins after the beheading of John the Baptist as Jesus prepares to go to Jerusalem.

In the later Judean ministry Jesus starts his final journey to Jerusalem through Judea. As Jesus travels towards Jerusalem, in the later Perean ministry, about one third the way down from the Sea of Galilee (actually a freshwater lake) along the River Jordan, he returns to the area where he was baptized.

The final ministry in Jerusalem is sometimes called the Passion week and begins with Jesus' triumphal entry into Jerusalem. The gospels provide more details about the final ministry than the other periods, devoting about one third of their text to the last week of the life of Jesus in Jerusalem.

Overview 

The gospel accounts place the beginning of Jesus' ministry in the countryside of Roman Judea, near the River Jordan.

The gospels present John the Baptist's ministry as the precursor to that of Jesus and the baptism of Jesus as marking the beginning of Jesus' ministry, after which Jesus travels, preaches and performs miracles. Jesus's baptism is generally considered the beginning and the Last Supper with his disciples in Jerusalem as the end of his ministry. However, some authors also consider the period between the Resurrection and the Ascension part of the ministry of Jesus.

Luke  states that Jesus was "about 30 years of age" at the start of his ministry. There have been different approaches to estimating the date of the start of the ministry of Jesus. One approach, based on combining information from the Gospel of Luke with historical data about Emperor Tiberius yields a date around 28–29 AD/CE, while a second independent approach based on statements in the Gospel of John along with historical information from Josephus about the Temple in Jerusalem leads to a date around AD 27–29.

In the New Testament, the date of the Last Supper is very close before the date of the crucifixion of Jesus (hence its name). Scholarly estimates for the date of the crucifixion generally fall in the range AD 30–36.

The three Synoptic Gospels refer to just one passover, specifically the Passover at the end of Jesus's ministry when he is crucified (with the exception of Luke's Gospel, which narrates a visit of the Holy Family for Passover when Jesus is twelve years old). There are three references to Passovers in John's Gospel: 2:13, 6:4, and 12:1. Some contend that the Gospel of John refers to only two actual Passovers, one at the beginning of Jesus's ministry and the second at the end of Jesus's ministry, and that the third reference to Passover is only a forecasting of the second Passover in the Gospel of John. But much scholarship recognizes that a lot of time passes between 6:4, "the Passover . . . was at hand," and 12:1, "Six days before the Passover, Jesus came to Bethany..," especially at the beginning of Chapter 7 which even includes another feast (Booths/Tabernacles), and then again at 10:22 another season passes as well as the Feast of Dedication.

This third reference to a passover in the Gospel of John is why many suggest that Jesus's ministry was a period of about three years. Scholars that support a three-year ministry, such as Köstenberger state that the Gospel of John simply provides a more detailed account.

During the ministry of Jesus, the tetrarch ruling over Galilee and Perea in this period was Herod Antipas, who obtained the position upon the division of the territories following the death of Herod the Great in 4 BC.

Baptism and early ministry

The gospels present John the Baptist's ministry as the precursor to that of Jesus and the Baptism of Jesus as marking the beginning of Jesus' ministry.

 specifies the location where John was baptizing as "Bethany beyond the Jordan". This is not the village Bethany just east of Jerusalem, but the town of Bethabara in Perea. Perea is the province east of the Jordan, across the southern part of Samaria, and although the New Testament does not mention Perea by name,  implicitly refers to it again when it states that John was baptising in Enon near Salim, "because there was much water there". First-century historian Flavius Josephus also wrote in the Antiquities of the Jews (18 5.2) that John the Baptist was imprisoned and then killed in Machaerus on the border of Perea.

Assuming that there were two incidences of Cleansing of the Temple, which was located in Jerusalem, a possible reference to an early Judean ministry may be .

Ministry in Galilee

Early Galilean ministry 

The Early Galilean ministry begins when, according to Matthew, Jesus goes back to Galilee from the Judean desert, after rebuffing the temptation of Satan.

The Gospel of John includes the Wedding at Cana as the first miracle of Jesus taking place in this early period of ministry, with his return to Galilee. A few villages in Galilee (e.g. Kafr Kanna) have been suggested as the location of Cana.

The return of Jesus to Galilee follows the arrest of John the Baptist. The early teachings of Jesus result in his rejection at his hometown when in  Jesus says in a Synagogue: "No prophet is acceptable in his own country" and the people reject him.

In this early period, Jesus' reputation begins to spread throughout Galilee.

 includes the first Miraculous draught of fishes episode in which Jesus tells Peter, "now on you will catch men". Peter leaves his net and, along with him, James and John, the sons of Zebedee, follows Jesus as disciples thereafter.

This period includes the Sermon on the Mount, one of the major discourses of Jesus in Matthew, and the Sermon on the Plain in the Gospel of Luke. The Sermon on the Mount, which covers chapters 5, 6 and 7 of the Gospel of Matthew, is the first of the Five Discourses of Matthew and is the longest piece of teaching from Jesus in the New Testament. It encapsulates many of the moral teachings of Jesus and includes the Beatitudes and the widely recited Lord's Prayer.

The Beatitudes are expressed as eight blessings in the Sermon on the Mount in Matthew, and four similar blessings appear in the Sermon on the Plain in Luke, where they are followed by four woes that mirror the blessings. The Beatitudes present the highest ideals of the teachings of Jesus on mercy, spirituality and compassion.

Major Galilean ministry
The Major Galilean ministry, also called the Great Galilean ministry, begins in Matthew 8, after the Sermon on the Mount and refers to activities up to the death of John the Baptist.

The beginnings of this period include The Centurion's Servant and Calming the storm, both dealing with the theme of faith and fear. When the Centurion shows faith in Jesus by requesting a "healing at a distance", Jesus commends him for his exceptional faith. On the other hand, when his own disciples show fear of a storm on the Sea of Galilee, Jesus instructs them to have more faith, after he orders the storm to stop.

The conflicts and criticism between Jesus and the Pharisees continue, e.g. they criticize Jesus for associating with "publicans and sinners", whereby Jesus responds: "It is not healthy who need a doctor, but the sick. I have not come to call the righteous, but sinners to repentance."

Commissioning the twelve Apostles relates the initial selection of the twelve Apostles among the disciples of Jesus. Jesus goes out to a mountainside to pray, and after spending the night praying to God, in the morning he calls his disciples and chooses twelve of them.

Separately,  relates the Seventy Disciples, where Jesus appoints a larger number of disciples and sends them out in pairs with the Missionary's Mandate to go into villages before Jesus' arrival there.

In  two messengers from John the Baptist arrive to ask Jesus if he is the expected Messiah, or "shall we wait for another?" Jesus replies, "Go back and report to John what you hear and see: The blind receive sight, the lame walk". Following this, Jesus begins to speak to the crowds about the Baptist.

These include the parables of The Sower, The Tares, The Mustard Seed and The Leaven, addressed to the public at large, as well as The Hidden Treasure, The Pearl and Drawing in the Net.

At the end of the Major Galilean ministry, Jesus returns to his hometown, Nazareth. His wisdom is recognised there, questioned, and rejected.

Final Galilean ministry

After hearing of the Baptist's death, Jesus withdraws by boat privately to a solitary place near Bethsaida, where he addresses the crowds who had followed him on foot from the towns, and feeds them all with "five loaves and two fish" supplied by a boy.

The episode emphasizes the importance of faith by stating that, when he attempted to walk on water, Peter began to sink when he lost faith and became afraid. At the end of the episode, the disciples increase their faith in Jesus, and, in Matthew 14:33, they say: "Of a truth thou art the Son of God".

This episode is an example of how Jesus emphasizes the value of faith, telling the woman: "Woman, you have great faith! Your request is granted."

After the healing, the disciples say: "He even makes the deaf hear and the mute speak."

Judea and Perea to Jerusalem

Later Judean ministry 
In this period, Jesus starts his final journey to Jerusalem by going around Samaria, through Perea and on through Judea to Jerusalem. At the beginning of this period, Jesus predicts his death for the first time, and this prediction then builds up to the other two episodes, the final prediction being just before Jesus enters Jerusalem for the last time, the week of his crucifixion.

Later in this period, at about the middle of each of the three Synoptic Gospels, two related episodes mark a turning point in the ministry of Jesus: the Confession of Peter and the Transfiguration of Jesus. These episodes begin in Caesarea Philippi, just north of the Sea of Galilee, at the beginning of the final journey to Jerusalem which ends in the Passion and Resurrection of Jesus. These episodes mark the beginnings of the gradual disclosure of the identity of Jesus as the Messiah to his disciples; and his prediction of his own suffering and death.

Jesus asks his disciples: But who do you say that I am? Simon Peter answers him: You are the Christ, the Son of the living God. In , Jesus blesses Peter for his answer, and states: "flesh and blood hath not revealed it unto thee, but my Father who is in heaven." In blessing Peter, Jesus not only accepts the titles Christ and Son of God, which Peter attributes to him, but declares the proclamation a divine revelation by stating that his Father in Heaven had revealed it to Peter. In this assertion, by endorsing both titles as divine revelation, Jesus unequivocally declares himself to be both Christ and the Son of God.

In the Gospel of Matthew, following this episode, Jesus also selects Peter as the leader of the Apostles, and states that "upon this rock, I will build my church".
In  Jesus then continues:
"That thou art Peter, and upon this rock, I will build my church".

Later Perean ministry
Jesus takes Peter and two other apostles with him and goes up to a mountain, which is not named. Once on the mountain,  states that Jesus "was transfigured before them; his face shining as the sun, and his garments became white as the light." At that point, the prophets Elijah and Moses appear and Jesus begins to talk to them. Luke is specific in describing Jesus in a state of glory, with  referring to "they saw his glory". A bright cloud appears around them, and a voice from the cloud states: "This is my beloved Son, with whom I am well pleased; listen to him".

The Transfiguration not only supports the identity of Jesus as the Son of God, (as in his Baptism), but the statement "listen to him" identifies him as the messenger and mouth-piece of God. The significance is enhanced by the presence of Elijah and Moses, for it indicates to the apostles that Jesus is the voice of God, and, instead of Elijah or Moses, he should be listened to, by virtue of his filial relationship with God.  echoes the same message: at the Transfiguration, God assigns to Jesus a special "honor and glory" and it is the turning point at which God exalts Jesus above all other powers in creation.

Many of the episodes in the Later Judean ministry are from the Gospel of Luke but, in general, these sequence of episodes in Luke do not provide enough geographical information to determine Perea, though scholars generally assume that the route Jesus followed from Galilee to Jerusalem passed through Perea. However, the Gospel of John does state that he returned to the area where he was baptized, and  states that "many people believed in him beyond the Jordan", saying "all things whatsoever John spake of this man were true".

This period of ministry includes the Discourse on the Church, in which Jesus anticipates a future community of followers and explains the role of his apostles in leading it. It includes the parables of The Lost Sheep and The Unforgiving Servant in Matthew 18, which also refer to the Kingdom of Heaven. The general theme of the discourse is the anticipation of a future community of followers, and the role of his apostles in leading it.

The discourse emphasizes the importance of humility and self-sacrifice as the high virtues within the anticipated community. It teaches that in the Kingdom of God, it is personal humility that matters, not social prominence and clout.

In the Gospel of John, the raising of Lazarus is the climax of the "seven signs" which gradually confirm the identity of Jesus as the Son of God and the expected Messiah. It is also a pivotal episode which starts the chain of events that leads to the crowds seeking Jesus on his Triumphal entry into Jerusalem—leading to the decision of Caiaphas and the Sanhedrin to plan to kill Jesus (Crucifixion of Jesus).

Final ministry in Jerusalem

The final ministry in Jerusalem is traditionally called the Passion and begins with Jesus' triumphal entry into Jerusalem early in the week that includes the Last Supper and is liturgically marked as Holy Week. The gospels pay special attention to the account of the last week of the life of Jesus in Jerusalem, and the narrative amounts to about one third of the text of the four gospels, showing its theological significance in Christian thought in the Early Church.

In  as Jesus approaches Jerusalem, he looks at the city and weeps over it, foretelling the suffering that awaits the city.

In the three Synoptic Gospels, entry into Jerusalem is followed by the Cleansing of the Temple episode, in which Jesus expels the money changers from the Temple, accusing them of turning the Temple to a den of thieves through their commercial activities. This is the only account of Jesus using physical force in any of the Gospels. The synoptics include a number of well known parables and sermons such as the Widow's mite and the Second Coming Prophecy during the week that follows.

In that week, the synoptics also narrate conflicts between Jesus and the elders of the Jews, in episodes such as the Authority of Jesus Questioned and the Woes of the Pharisees, in which Jesus criticizes their hypocrisy. Judas Iscariot, one of the twelve apostles, approaches the Jewish elders and performs the "Bargain of Judas" in which he accepts to betray Jesus and hand him over to the elders. Matthew specifies the price as thirty silver coins.

In Matthew 24, Mark 13 and Luke 21, Jesus provides a Discourse on the End Times, which is also called the Olivet Discourse because it was given on the Mount of Olives. The discourse is mostly about judgment and the expected conduct of the followers of Jesus, and the need for vigilance by the followers in view of the coming judgment. The discourse is generally viewed as referring both to the coming destruction of the Temple in Jerusalem, as well as the End Times and Second Coming of Christ, but the many scholarly opinions about which verses refer to which event remain divided.

A key episode in the final part of the ministry of Jesus is the Last Supper, which includes the Institution of the Eucharist. He also gives them "the cup" to drink, saying this is his blood. While it may have been fermented, none of the biblical accounts refer to it as wine, but rather as "the fruit of the vine" or "the cup".
In , Paul the Apostle refers to the Last Supper.  concludes the Last Supper with a long, three chapter sermon known as the Farewell discourse which prepares the disciples for the departure of Jesus.

See also
Gospels and theology
 Christ myth theory
 Gospel harmony
 Historical Jesus
 Jesus Seminar
 Jesus in Christianity
 Life of Christ in art
 Life of Jesus in the New Testament
 Miracles of Jesus
 Parables of Jesus

Associated places
 Al-Maghtas
 Qasr el Yahud

Notes

References 
 Citations

Life of Jesus in the New Testament